Swallow Falls is a name coined by early tourists for the , a multiple waterfall system in Wales, located on the  near , in Conwy County Borough.

History

Swallow Falls is located on  near , in Conwy County Borough. It is thought that the English name arose from a mis-hearing of the Welsh word  ('foaming') as the similar-sounding  ('swallow').

In 1913 the second Lord Ancaster, the landowner, gave the Swallow Falls to the local council, who decided to charge for visiting it in order to pay off some of the £15,000 debt incurred through the installation of water and electricity supplies to the village. Once the debt of costs of installation was cleared the parish retained the fee, resulting in  having the lowest rates in the country. By the 1930s, the waterfall had become a popular tourist destination, although there were few visitors during the winter off-season. A writer in the Yorkshire Post and Leeds Intelligencer on 17 January 1933, described the waterfall as coming "over the rocks in a perfect torrent, peerless white in the dusk."

In 1939, Richard Morris, the former chairman of the local council, was charged with making false entries in the upkeep of the tolls. There was a total deficiency of £67 15s 6d; by the time the charge was laid, Morris had already repaid the sum. The cheap water and electricity rates ended after local government reorganisation in 1974.

References

Betws-y-Coed
Capel Curig
Waterfalls of Conwy County Borough
Waterfalls of Snowdonia